Peter Bankes is an English professional football referee, who officiates many games in the Premier League and the EFL Championship.

Career 
Bankes was moved into Select Group 1 ahead of the 2019–20 campaign after joining Select Group 2 three seasons prior. On 31 August 2019, Bankes refereed his first Premier League game between Leicester City and AFC Bournemouth and issued a total of four yellow cards throughout the game. On 22 February 2020, Bankes showed his first Premier League red card to Newcastle United player Valentino Lazaro after he fouled Crystal Palace forward Wilfried Zaha, who was through on goal.

References

Living people
English football referees
English Football League referees
Year of birth missing (living people)
Premier League referees